was a Japanese film actor. He appeared in more than sixty films from 1943 to 1973.

Career
Kōno started acting with the Zenshinza theater troupe before joining the Toho studio in 1942. Mostly a character actor, he appeared in films by directors such as Akira Kurosawa and Kenji Mizoguchi as well on television.

Selected filmography

References

External links
 

1911 births
1978 deaths
People from Nagasaki
Japanese male film actors